Nélida Lobato, born Haydée Nélida Menta (19 June 1934 – 9 May 1982), was an Argentinian dancer, vedette, model and actress.

She began her career at 18 years old in a programme of LR3 Radio Belgrano Televisión showing her talent for the dance and later, when Buddy Day, owner of the theatre Bim-Bam-Bum in Santiago, Chile, gave her the opportunity to star in his theatre. Despite her small stature, she had sex appeal and was noted for her exuberance on the stage. In 1955, she was a ballet dancer in Alfredo Alaria dance company. She replaced dancer Eber Lobato's sister (who was his first dance partner), 15 days after starting the relationship, Eber asked for her marriage.
Eber became a choreographer and began to improve her career.

She starred in the show at the legendary Lido de Paris, France in Champs-Elysées, after appearing in Las Vegas, where her show lasted almost five years. In Buenos Aires, she starred in several "revistas" (variety shows) and played 'Roxie Hart' in the original Buenos Aires version of the musical Chicago.

She separated from Eber Lobato in 1962, after she had suffered a miscarriage. They carried on working together until 1967, when he remarried.

In 1965, she starred in the 1964 exploitation film Scream of the Butterfly directed by Eber Lobato, co starring Mary Leona Gage, Nick Novarro and Richard Beebe.

She later became the partner of Víctor Laplace, an acclaimed Argentinian film actor, and accompanied him into exile when he left Buenos Aires, after being threatened by the Triple A.

She died of cancer in 1982.

Lobato's grandson, Lenny, is a professional footballer.

Filmography

References

External links 

 
 

1934 births
1982 deaths
People from Buenos Aires
Argentine television personalities
Women television personalities
Argentine vedettes
Argentine female dancers
Burials at La Chacarita Cemetery
20th-century Argentine actresses